The Accademia Tadini is a museum and art gallery, as well as an academy of both visual arts and music in Lovere, Province of Bergamo, Italy. It is located on Via Tadini #40, facing the shores of Lago d'Iseo.

History
The Tadini Academy of Fine Arts has its roots in the interest and collections of Count Luigi Tadini of Verona (1745-1829). At the turn of the 18th-century, the count envisioned housing his collections in a proper setting. The family residence in Palazzo Barboglio facing the present Piazza Garibaldi proved too small; thus adjacent to this site, on the road linking Lovere and Bergamo, along the lake, he had his grandson, Sebastiano Salimbeni, a self-trained architect design the present palace. Work began in 1820 with the chapel, built to house the Stele Tadini (1819-1821), a work of Antonio Canova, and dedicated to his former friend, Faustino Tadini, son of the count who had died in 1799 at the age of 25. Faustino had published a book on the early work of Canova in 1796. By 1826, the Gallery building was complete. The interior decorations, both stucco and fresco, were designed and completed by Luigi Dell'Era. By 1828, the museum was open to the public. He intended the collections and decoration to be aids for the curriculum of the school of design.

The Piano Nobile displays the collection. In addition to the paintings, the collection includes archeologic pieces collected in Naples; porcelain from both the orient (China and Japan) and Europe (Meissen, Vienna, Sèvres, Naples, and Venice). The count has a collection of sculptures by Canova and Giovanni Maria Benzoni. The library includes nearly 4600 volumes. The great hall of the palace is used for both concerts and theatrical presentations. The second floor has a display of artifacts related to the Resorgimento era in Italy.

Among the paintings the count had eclectic acquisitions, including:
Madonna attributed to Jacobello di Bonomo
Madonna and Child by Francesco Benaglio
St Antony of Padua by Antonio and Bartolomeo Vivarini
Two altarpieces by Vincenzo Civerchio
Works from suppressed ecclesiastical institutions of Crema
Madonna and Child with Saints Christopher and George (Manfron altarpiece) by Paris Bordon
Flight to Egypt by Aurelio Busso
Resurrection by Jacopo Ligozzi
Ecce Homo by Paolo Farinati
Judith and Holofernes attributed to Bernardino Fusari
Prayer in Gesthemane by Pietro Ricchi
Madonna and Child by Jacopo Bellini
Madonna and Child and Saints by Palma il Giovane
Dead Christ and Angels by Pietro della Vecchia
Madonna and Child by Francesco Benaglio
Saints Francis and William by Domenico Brusasorci
Flight to Egypt by Felice Brusasorci
Joseph and Potiphar's wife by Carlo Francesco Nuvolone
Madonna di Loreto by Bernardino Campi
Flight to Egypt by Domenico Pecchio
Self-portrait by Antonio Cifrondi
Portrait of a Townsfolk by Cifrondi
Portrait of Friar with Lily by Fra Galgario
Ecce Homo and two other canvases by Francesco Hayez
The collection has also modern and contemporary works.

References

Art schools in Italy
Art museums and galleries in Lombardy
Museums in Lombardy
1829 establishments in Italy
Art museums established in 1829
Neoclassical architecture in Lombardy